Spring Fling can refer to:

 Spring Fling!, 1995 film
 "Spring Fling", 6teen episode
 "Spring Fling", Zoey 101 episode
Spring Fling Open Studios, an event in Scotland

See also
"Spring-a-Ding-Fling", Modern Family episode
Spring Thing, an annual competition to highlight works of text adventure games and other literary works, also known as Interactive Fiction